Karin Brandstätter (born October 6, 1983 in Graz) is an Austrian former competitive figure skater. She is the 2005 Austrian national champion. She placed 35th at the 2005 European Championships.

Programs

Competitive highlights 
JGP: Junior Grand Prix

References

External links
 
 Tracings.net profile

Austrian female single skaters
1983 births
Sportspeople from Graz
Living people
Figure skaters at the 2007 Winter Universiade